Valledoria (Gallurese: Codaruìna, Sassarese: Codaruìna) is a town and comune in the province of Sassari situated at the center of the Gulf of Asinara, near the mouth of the Coghinas river.

History
Valledoria was part of the giudicato of Torres, and was later acquired by the Genoese family of Doria. After the Aragonese conquest of Sardinia, the area was struck by plague which highly depopulated it.

A demographic rise occurred in the early 19th century, when new settlers coming from Aggius and Tempio Pausania created Codaruina. In 1960 the latter became an autonomous commune with the name of Valledoria. In 1983 the frazione of Santa Maria Coghinas became an independent commune.

References

 

Cities and towns in Sardinia
1960 establishments in Italy
States and territories established in 1960